64–'95 is the third studio album by Lemon Jelly. The concept album contains tracks that take samples from songs recorded between the years 1964 and 1995. The number that precedes the song title denotes from which year the sample is taken.

The album is rather different from their previous two releases in that it has a darker sound and is influenced by more modern sounding music. To avoid confusion over the matter, the band included a sticker on the sleeve stating, "This is our new album, it's not like our old album."

A hidden track, "Yes!", appears before track 1 on the special edition CD version of the album. This is a short additional spoken word sample featuring the same voice which appears on the first track, "It Was...". A DVD version of the album was also released, with animated videos for each track.

The inclusion of the sample of "Horrorshow" by the Scars, a group that was at the time considered to be rather obscure, sparked a renewed interest in the Scottish post-punkers and helped to reunite some members of the band. This resulted in the group being able to release their long out-of-print album Author! Author! on CD—member Fred Deakin was a fan of the group in his adolescence.

Track listing
Information is based on the album's liner notes
"Yes! / It Was..." – 1:47 (This name does not appear on CD cover / insert)
"Come Down on Me" – 5:50
"Only Time" – 6:36
"Don't Stop Now" – 6:56
"Make Things Right" – 6:00
"The Shouty Track" – 3:41
"Stay with You" – 6:10
"The Slow Train" – 5:40
"A Man Like Me" – 5:16
"Go" – 6:30

Notes
Lemon Jelly is Nick Franglen and Fred Deakin
Music arrangement and sampling, additional material composition and additional instruments and vocals performed by Lemon Jelly
"Slow Train" sample written by Flanders & Swann
"I'm a Train" sample written by Albert Hammond

Charts

References

Lemon Jelly albums
2005 albums
Concept albums
XL Recordings albums
2005 video albums
XL Recordings video albums
Lemon Jelly video albums
Albums produced by Nick Franglen